Night Sky with Exit Wounds is a 2016 collection of poetry by Vietnamese American poet and essayist Ocean Vuong. The book won the T. S. Eliot Prize in 2017.

Content
Vuong and his family immigrated to the United States from Vietnam when he was two years old. Many of the poems in the collection take the Vietnam War as their subject, including "Aubade With Burning City" which deals with the Fall of Saigon. "Untitled (Blue, Green, and Brown)", named for a Mark Rothko painting, is about the 9/11 attacks and Vuong's experience that day.

References

2016 poetry books
American poetry collections
Copper Canyon Press books
Poetry by Ocean Vuong
T. S. Eliot Prize-winning works